The Uzbekistan Fed Cup team represents Uzbekistan in Fed Cup tennis competition and are governed by the Uzbekistan Tennis Federation.  They currently compete in the Asia/Oceania Zone of Group I. Current Uzbek Team consists of Akgul Amanmuradova  (WTA ranking 63), Sabina Sharipova (WTA ranking 333) and Nigina Abduraimova (WTA ranking 497).

History
Uzbekistan competed in its first Fed Cup in 1995.  Their best result was 2nd in Asia/Oceania Group I in 2011, losing the decisive promotion play off to Japan. In 2016, Uzbekistan lost the relegation play-off against South Korea and was relegated to Asia/Oceania Zone II in 2017. In Zone II, Uzbekistan reached the promotional play-offs on each occasion 2017, 2018, and 2019, the year which they won the promotional play-offs.

Players

See also
Fed Cup
Uzbekistan Davis Cup team

External links
 Uzbekistan Fed Cup team
 Akgul Amanmuradova - Official Site

Billie Jean King Cup teams
Fed Cup
Fed Cup